Palline micramyla is a species of small air-breathing land snails, terrestrial pulmonate gastropod mollusks in the family Charopidae. This species is endemic to Micronesia.

References

M
Fauna of Micronesia
Molluscs of Oceania
Molluscs of the Pacific Ocean
Taxonomy articles created by Polbot